Tarsal may refer to: 

 Tarsal artery (disambiguation)
 Tarsal bone
 Tarsal glands
 tarsus (skeleton) (skeleton)
 tarsus (eyelids) (eye)
 superior tarsal muscle (eye)

See also
 Tarsalia (bee), a genus of bees